Abdur Rahman Siddiqui (1887–1953) was an East Pakistani politician, businessman and journalist. He was the acting Governor of East Pakistan for three and a half months in 1952 while Feroz Khan Noon was on leave.

Education
He graduated from Aligarh Muslim University and travelled to England for further education.

Career
After completing his education, Siddiqui joined The Comrade, a journal published by Mohammad Ali Jouhar. He was the managing editor of the journal, which was published from Calcutta. Siddiqui involved himself in the Khilafat Movement and volunteered as a medic in the Balkan Wars. He was one of the founding members of the All-India Muslim League and a key participator of the Pakistan Movement. Siddiqui contested in the 1937 Bengal legislative elections, winning in the Chamber of Commerce constituency. In 1940, he was elected Mayor of Calcutta. He preserved his seat at the 1946 Bengal legislative elections.

He initiated the publication of The Daily Morning News in Calcutta of which he was the editor from 1942 to 1948. Siddiqui was also one of the founders of Eastern Federal Insurance Company.

Death
Siddiqui died in 1953.

See also
 List of Pakistanis

References

Muhajir people
1953 deaths
1887 births
Governors of East Pakistan
Aligarh Muslim University alumni
bn:আবদুর রহমান সিদ্দিকী